A puffball is a type of fungi.

Puffball may also refer to:

 Puffball (novel), a 1980 supernatural novel by Fay Weldon
 Puffball (film), a 2007 British film adaptation of the novel
 Puffball Collective, a Marvel Comics group
 Puffball Islands, a group of Antarctic islands

See also
Caenocara, a beetle genus, some species of which are known as puffball beetles